Yezhihu Station, is a transfer station on Line 7 and Line 8 of the Wuhan Metro. It entered revenue service on October 1, 2018. It is located in Hongshan District.

Station layout

References

Wuhan Metro stations
Line 7, Wuhan Metro
Line 8, Wuhan Metro
Railway stations in China opened in 2018